Praděd (literally "great grandfather") is the highest mountain of the Hrubý Jeseník mountains, Moravia, Czech Silesia and Upper Silesia and is the fifth-highest mountain of the Czech Republic. The highest point of Moravia is located near the summit of Praděd; but the summit itself is in Czech Silesia.

The upper platform is used as a watchtower. The mountain is also a popular area for skiing.

History

It was built in 1903–1912 by the Sudeten German tourist association. After 1945, the tourist association no longer existed because all Germans were expelled. Due to its unmaintained condition in communist Czechoslovakia, with water freezing in cracks breaking it up, the watchtower collapsed 2 May 1959 shortly before it was supposed to get fixed.

The Petrovy kameny ("Peter's stones") is a gneiss stone formation near the peak. In the Middle Ages, people feared the place, believing witches lived there. The area is home to many rare plants, so it is not open to the public.

The transmitter was built between 1968 and 1983. A restaurant is located in the building and can be reached by a paved road. The High Tatras, Malá Fatra Mts. and Alps can be seen from the watchtower platform.

Protection of nature
Praděd lies in the Jeseníky Protected Landscape Area. The area of the peak and its surroundings is also specially protected as the Praděd National Nature Reserve.

1950 air accident
On 27 February 1950 at 07:31 Československé státní aerolinie Douglas C-47A-15-DK on its way from Ostrava-Hrabůvka Airport to Prague Ruzyně Airport crashed into the side of Praděd mountain, killing 3 crew and 3 passengers. 25 others, including 21 passengers and 4 crew survived the accident.

References

Mountains and hills of the Czech Republic
Ski areas and resorts in the Czech Republic